Farmington Regional Airport (ICAO: KFAM, FAA LID: FAM) is a public airport located about  south of the center of Farmington, a city located in St. Francois County, Missouri, United States.

Although many U.S. airports use the same 3-letter location identifier for the FAA and IATA, this airport is not designated by the IATA.

This facility is included in the National Plan of Integrated Airport Systems, which categorized it as a general aviation airport.



Facilities and Aircraft 

For the 12-month period ending on December 31, 2019, the airport had 11,800 operations, an average of 32 per day: 91% general aviation, 8.5% air taxi, and 0.4% military. At that time there were 26 aircraft based at the airport: 18 single-engine aircraft, 5 multi-engine aircraft, 2 jet aircraft and 1 helicopter.

See also 
 List of airports in Missouri

References

External links 
 Farmington City Website Section
 MoDOT Economic Impact Study
 FAA FAM Information
 MoDOT Airport Directory (FAM pg. 80-81)

Airports in Missouri
Transportation in St. Francois County, Missouri
Buildings and structures in St. Francois County, Missouri